River Landscape with a Boar Hunt, or Dutch: Rivierlandschap met everzwijnjacht, is a c. 1600 painting by the Flemish artist Joos de Momper, now in the Rijksmuseum, in Amsterdam. The artist uses a high point of view, like in Altdorfer's The Battle of Alexander at Issus (1528-1529) and Brueghel's The Hunters in the Snow (1565). Later, de Momper mostly used a lower point of view, establishing what would become a typical feature of 17th century Dutch and Flemish landscapes, such as Windmill at Wijk bij Duurstede.

References

Paintings by Joos de Momper
Landscape paintings
1600 paintings
Hunting in art
Dogs in art
Horses in art
Maritime paintings